Masih Alinejad (born Masoumeh Alinejad-Ghomikolayi, September 11, 1976) is an Iranian-American journalist, author, and women's rights activist. Alinejad currently works as a presenter/producer at VOA Persian Service, a correspondent for Radio Farda, a frequent contributor for Manoto television, and a contributing editor for IranWire.
Alinejad focuses on criticism of the status of human rights in Iran, especially women's rights in Iran. She now lives in exile in New York City, and has won several awards, including the 2015 Geneva Summit for Human Rights and Democracy women's rights award, the Omid Journalism Award from the Mehdi Semsar Foundation, and a "Highly Commended" AIB Media Excellence Award.
In 2019, Alinejad sued the Iranian government in a U.S. federal court for harassment against her and her family. She released a book in 2018 called The Wind in My Hair that deals with her experiences growing up in Iran, where she writes girls "are raised to keep their heads low, to be unobtrusive as possible, and to be meek". In 2021, U.S. prosecutors charged four Iranian intelligence officials with plotting to kidnap a critic of the Iranian government; the target was not named, but Masih believes it was she.

Early life and career in Iran 
Alinejad was born as Masoumeh Alinejad, but uses the first name "Masih" (Persian for "anointed" or "Messiah"). Alinejad was politically conscious from a young age, and was arrested in 1994 for producing leaflets critical of the government. Masih Alinejad wrote in her book that she started journalism with the help of Marjan Sheikholeslami. She began her career in journalism in 2001 with the local daily Hambastegi, and then for the Iranian Labour News Agency (ILNA). Other publications such as Shargh, Bahar, Vaghaye Ettefaghiye, Ham-Mihan, and Etemad, have also published her work. During the sixth and seventh parliament, Alinejad was a parliamentary reporter. In 2005, she wrote an article suggesting that government ministers had claimed they received pay cuts; they were actually receiving considerable sums of money as "bonuses" for everything from serving religious duties to ringing in the New Year. The article generated controversy, and led to her dismissal from parliament.
In 2008, she wrote an exceptionally critical piece in Etemad, called "Song of the Dolphins", where she compared Mahmoud Ahmadinejad's followers to hungry dolphins that make sounds and perform entertaining acts to grab a morsel of food from their trainer. Some supporters of President Ahmadinejad expressed their sense of outrage and offense, eventually forcing the director of the newspaper Mehdi Karroubi, himself a relatively popular and very powerful establishment politician and cleric, to publicly apologize. In the summer of 2009, during her stay in the United States, Alinejad tried very hard to get an interview with Barack Obama; however, she was refused the interview, although she had been granted a temporary visa on that very basis. When her visa expired, she was forced to return to the United Kingdom. While in the United States, she participated in some Iranian anti-government protests, and delivered a speech in San Francisco, where she said, addressing the authorities of Iran, "We have trembled for thirty years, now it is your turn to tremble." Her interview with Voice of America was shown together with parts of the videos she had made, called "A Storm of Fresh Air". In 2010, she and a group of Iranian writers and intellectuals established the "IranNeda" foundation. After the presidential election in Iran in 2009, she published a novel called A Green Date. 
Alinejad graduated from Oxford Brookes University with a degree in Communications Studies.

Career

Opposition to Iranian government

In 2014, Alinejad launched My Stealthy Freedom (also known as Stealthy Freedoms of Iranian Women), a Facebook page that invites Iranian women to post pictures of themselves without a hijab. The page quickly attracted international attention, and has garnered hundreds of thousands of likes.
In 2015, the Geneva Summit for Human Rights and Democracy, awarded her its women's rights prize for "giving a voice to the voiceless and stirring the conscience of humanity to support the struggle of Iranian women for basic human rights, freedom, and equality".

On June 13, 2022, she was awarded the American Jewish Committee's Moral Courage Award for speaking out fearlessly in support of the Iranian people being oppressed by the Iranian government.

Alinejad has said she is not opposed to the hijab per se, but believes it should be a matter of personal choice. In Iran, women who appear in public without a hijab risk being arrested, imprisoned, and fined.

Journalism
Masih Alinejad wrote in her book: "Marjan Sheikholeslami, the head of the political department of Hambastegi newspaper agreed to take me under her wing." Since 2015, Alinejad has hosted a weekly 15-minute primetime show called Tablet for Voice of America's Persian Language Service. "With original video from inside Iran, Tablet profiles ordinary citizens and connects them with Americans through short interviews on common themes illustrating both similar and different experiences. The program also has a weekly "timeline report", tracing the development of issues such as the international women's rights movement and relations between Washington and Tehran", the press release states.

In July 2019, Iranian authorities warned the public that anyone sending videos to Alinejad faced up to 10 years in prison. Musa Ghazanfarabadi, the head of Tehran's Revolutionary Court, told Fars News that those sharing protest videos with Alinejad could be imprisoned for up to a decade under laws relating to cooperating with an enemy of the state.

Anti-compulsory hijab campaign

Alinejad has been critical of the Islamic Republic of Iran's laws making it illegal for women not to wear a hijab outside the home, but also making the broader point that in the current historical and political context – in previous decades it wasn't required or common in Iran and many other Muslim-majority countries – describing it as the most visible symbol of oppression, Journalist Kim Ghattas has described Alinejad as "spearheading" the campaign against the mandatory veil in Iran even from her residence in Brooklyn.

Some feminists have supported Alinejad's campaign because, in their view, the Islamic veil is the most visible example of women's oppression in Muslim majority societies. However, postcolonial feminists criticized the campaign for invoking the old "Orientalist cultural imagination" in the West, which was based on stereotypes of oppressed women in the Orient who need to be liberated by adopting Western ideals. Islamic feminists, meanwhile, viewed this effort as bolstering the rising wave of Islamophobia in Europe and the United States, which portrays Islam as a misogynist religion. Alinejad rejects accusations of Islamophobia while insisting that it is religious laws (Sharia) which scare her, and that it is that same religious fanaticism that is the primary cause of Islamophobia. Speaking about hijab during a debate with Palestinian-American activist Linda Sarsour on CNN, Alinejad said: "It's important if you care about human rights, women's rights, you cannot use the same tool which is the most visible symbol of oppression in the Middle East and say that this is a sign of resistance [in the United States]."

After the Christchurch mosque shooting in March 2019 in New Zealand, Alinejad criticized New Zealand Prime Minister Jacinda Ardern for wearing a hijab ostensibly in sympathy and respect to the Muslim victims. She said she "felt that you are using one of the most visible symbols of oppression for Muslim women in many countries for solidarity, and it also broke my heart".

Chess championship boycott
In 2016, Alinejad launched a boycott campaign against the 2016 women's chess world championship, to be held in February 2017 in Tehran, Iran. The campaign was incited by Nazí Paikidze, a Georgian-American chess player. Paikidze, a non-Iranian, refused to attend world championships in Tehran because according to Iran's religious law, female players would be forced to wear a hijab. Alinejad supported the Paikidze, and co-wrote an op-ed with Indian-American Asra Nomani in The Washington Post.

Meeting with US Secretary of State

In February 2019, Masih Alinejad met with US Secretary of State Mike Pompeo. US State Department Deputy Spokesperson Robert Palladino said Secretary of State "thanked Ms. Alinejad for her bravery and continued dedication". Alinejad said they met for 35 minutes and she highlighted three areas. First, "Many Iranians want an end to the Islamic Republic. Opposition voices should be heard". Second, international community should focus on 40 years of human rights violations by the regime, and third, the Trump administration travel ban hurts human rights activists and students, not the regime.

Recognition

Awards 

 AIB Media Excellence Award for Radio Farda's production "Victims of 88", Nov 2013
 Inaugural Women’s Rights Award at the Geneva Summit, 2015
 Freethinker Prize by Swiss Freethinkers Association, 2017
 America Abroad Media award, Nov 2019
 Moral Courage Award by American Jewish Committee (AJC), Jun 2022
 Oxi Courage Award for her fight against Iran’s compulsory hijab, Oct 2022
 Scholar-Statesman Award by Washington Institute for Near East Policy for her tireless promotion of women’s rights, freedom, and political change in her native land, Nov 2022
 Global Impact Award, Dec 2022

Other Recognitions 
 Nominated for the Nobel Peace Prize for her advocacy for women's rights in Iran, 2022
 Named as one of the 12 Time Magazine's Women of the Year, March 2023

Harassment

Arrest and harassment of family members
On September 23, 2019, Islamic Republic security forces arrested three of Alinejad's family members as retribution for her women's rights activism, according to Amnesty International. Alinejad's brother, Alireza Alinejad, was arrested in Tehran, while Hadi and Leila Lotfi, brother and sister of her former husband, Max Lotfi, were all arrested in the northern city of Babol by officials from the ministry of intelligence.
Her parents, siblings, extended family and all relatives and associates who remained in their village, in northern Iran, were repeatedly harassed, threatened with loss of employment, and instructed to lure Alinejad to neighboring Turkey for a "family reunion," so that agents could supposedly "just talk" to her. Her brother warned her it was a trap. In 2018, Alinejad's sister and niece were forced to go on a prime-time television programme to say that the family was disgraced by Alinejad's behavior, and that their parents have disowned her.
Alinejad responded that her family was forced to say such things by the authorities, a common tactic employed by the Iranian government aimed at discrediting dissidents.

She wrote in a New York Times Op-ed published two weeks later: "The truth is that before the show aired, I got a call from my mother – a tiny, illiterate woman who has the toughness that comes from being abandoned at an early age by her own mother and married off at 14 years old. She was sobbing. The intelligence service had tried to pressure her and my father to participate in the show. And the local Friday prayer leader had called them out in public and urged them to cooperate. She refused – a show of loyalty that I can never repay." As did her brother Alireza, imprisoned after Intelligence agents raided his home and blindfolded and handcuffed him in front of his two small children, and dragged him away. He was sentenced to eight years, and remains in prison.

Iranian government smear campaign
By this point, Iranian authorities had been conducting a concerted smear campaign against Alinejad for a decade. Even going to such extremes as doctoring photos to make it look like she engaged in sexually provocative behavior, and showing them to her elderly, poorly-educated father. She told The Guardian in 2013 that her father had refused to speak to her for three years as a result. Iranian state-run media have run numerous fabricated stories, such as her being an MI6 agent serving directly under then-Queen Elizabeth II, false quotes attributed to her saying such things as "to be a journalist in Western countries, it is compulsory that you also work for the spy agencies", that she is a drug addict, and that she was a victim of rape on the London subway.

Kidnapping plot

In July 2021, the US Department of Justice claimed that four Iranian intelligence officials and a fifth assistant were planning to kidnap a New York-based journalist critical of Iran, as well as four further people in Canada and the UK. The Iranian kidnapping scheme—which appears to be the first publicized case on U.S. soil—dated back to at least June 2020. Robin Wright revealed in the New Yorker: "According to the D.O.J. announcement, the plotters had identified travel routes from Alinejad's home to a Brooklyn waterfront, researched a service offering military-style speedboats for maritime evacuation out of New York, and studied sea travel from New York to Venezuela, which has close ties with the Islamic Republic. In a detailed e-mail, Kiya Sadeghi, another of the four indicted Iranian intelligence agents, even instructed the private investigators to take pictures of the envelopes in Alinejad's mailbox. The F.B.I. stated that it had foiled Iran's scheme in the United States. "Not on our watch," William Sweeney, the head of New York's FBI office, said."

Assassination plot
On July 28, 2022, a man named Khalid Mehdiyev approached Alinejad's residence in Brooklyn, looking inside the windows and attempting to open the front door. He was stopped later that day by New York City Police during a traffic stop. His license had been suspended and he was arrested for driving without one. The police found a suitcase in his car containing an AK-47 assault rifle with an obliterated serial number. The rifle, manufactured by Norinco, was loaded with a round in the chamber and a magazine attached, along with a second, separate magazine and approximately 66 rounds of ammunition. Mehdiyev, who is from Yonkers, waived his Miranda rights and told police that he was looking for an apartment. Mehdiyev, unprompted, volunteered that he did not know about a gun and claimed the suitcase was not his. On August 11, 2022, Mehdiyev was indicted on one count of possessing a firearm with an obliterated serial number. In an opinion piece for The Wall Street Journal, Alinejad quotes a special agent of the Federal Bureau of Investigation as saying, "This time their objective was to kill you." On January 27, 2023, the US Department of Justice unsealed an indictment charging Mehdiyev and two other men in a plot to assassinate Alinejad.

Masih Alinejad Harassment and Unlawful Targeting (HUNT) Act of 2021 
In 2022, the US Congress passed a bill named after the US-based journalist, Masih Alinejad, to impose sanctions on foreign persons (i.e., individuals or entities) that are acting on behalf of Iran's government and involved in the harassment of certain individuals, such as human rights activists. As a result, the President must impose property-blocking sanctions on persons identified in the report, as well as visa-blocking sanctions on the identified individuals.

Bibliography 
Alinejad's memoir, The Wind in My Hair, dealing with her journey from a tiny village in northern Iran to becoming a journalist and creating an online movement that sparked a nationwide protest movement, was published by Little Brown in 2018. The New York Times wrote that the book paints a vivid portrait of modern Iran, saying that it was written with a "blunt honesty" that it considered to be a characteristic of Alinejad's life and writing.

She has published four books in Persian:
Tahasson – which describes the political turmoil/challenges created when the "Sixth Iranian Parliament" went on strike.
Taj-e-Khar (The Crown of Thorns) – a novel that is now being translated into English. It refers to the passion of the Christ and the crown of thorns placed on his head by the Romans.
I am Free – which deals with women's issues in Iran, published in Germany because of its being blacklisted by the Islamic Culture and Guidance Ministry, Iran's censorship body.
Gharar Sabz (Green Rendezvous) – which deals with post-2009 presidential election fraud violence. This book was also published in Germany, for the same reasons.

See also 
Women's rights in Iran
Human rights in Iran
Islamic Revolution
Theocracy
Guardianship of the Islamic Jurist
Islamic Revolutionary Court

References

External links

Official Website

Meet the Iconoclast Inspiring Iranian Women to Remove Their Headscarves in Vogue Magazine
Review of The Woman Whose Hair Frightens Iran in the New York Times book review

Iranian women journalists
Living people
Mazandarani people
Iranian exiles
People from Mazandaran Province
Alumni of Oxford Brookes University
1976 births
People from Babol
Iranian emigrants to the United States
Iranian women's rights activists
21st-century American journalists
Iranian political journalists
American women journalists
American women's rights activists
Iranian women activists
Iranian secularists
American secularists
Naturalized citizens of the United States
American political journalists
21st-century Iranian women writers
21st-century American women writers